Kyrylo Kryvoborodenko (born 8 September 1996) is a Ukrainian footballer who plays as a midfielder for FC Chernihiv.

Career

Yunist Chernihiv & RVUFK Kyiv
In 2011, Kryvoborodenko started his career with FC Yunist Chernihiv in Chernihiv. From 2012 to 2013 he played for RVUFK Kyiv.

YUSB Chernigiv
In 2015 he moved to FC Chernihiv's youth system.

FC Chernihiv
In 2017 he moved to FC Chernihiv and won the 2019 Football Championship of Chernihiv Oblast. In 2020 the team was promoted to the Ukrainian Second League. On 24 October, he made his debut against Rubikon Kyiv. On 21 September 2021, he scored against Karpaty Halych at the Enerhetyk Stadium in Burshtyn. On 27 August 2022 he made his debut in the Ukrainian First League against Skoruk Tomakivka at the Yunist Stadium in Chernihiv.

Career statistics

Club

Honours
FC Chernihiv
 Chernihiv Oblast Football Championship: 2019

Individual 
 Top Scorer of FC Chernihiv on the season 2019–20 (7 goals)

References

External links
Kyrylo Kryvoborodenko at FC Chernihiv 

1996 births
Living people
Ukrainian footballers
Footballers from Chernihiv
Association football midfielders
Piddubny Olympic College alumni
FC Yunist Chernihiv players
FC Chernihiv players
Ukrainian Second League players
Ukrainian First League players